George L. Campbell (8 September 1912 – 15 December 2004) was a Scottish linguist who worked for the BBC World Service from 1939 to 1974. He spoke forty-four languages and had a working knowledge of around twenty more.

Publications

References

1912 births
2004 deaths
BBC World Service people
People from Dingwall
Scottish linguists